Bernard Kaplan (May 7, 1913 – June 14, 1992) was an American football offensive lineman in the National Football League for the New York Giants and the Philadelphia Eagles.  He played college football at Western Maryland College (now known as McDaniel College).

Kaplan also wrestled for the United States team in the 1935 Maccabiah Games.

References

1913 births
1992 deaths
Players of American football from Philadelphia
American football offensive guards
New York Giants players
Philadelphia Eagles players
Western Maryland College alumni
Wilmington Clippers players